Pardaleodes is a genus of skipper butterflies in the family Hesperiidae.

Species
Pardaleodes bule Holland, 1896
Pardaleodes edipus (Stoll, [1781])
Pardaleodes fan (Holland, 1894)
Pardaleodes incerta (Snellen, 1872)
Pardaleodes sator (Westwood, 1852)
Pardaleodes tibullus (Fabricius, 1793)
Pardaleodes xanthopeplus Holland, 1892

References

External links
Natural History Museum Lepidoptera genus database
Seitz, A. Die Gross-Schmetterlinge der Erde 13: Die Afrikanischen Tagfalter. Plate XIII 79

Hesperiinae
Hesperiidae genera